Gabriel Orlandini Spessatto (born 16 July 1991), or simply Gabriel Spessatto, is a Brazilian professional footballer who plays as a right back for Aversa Normanna.

Career
Born in Encantado, Gabriel Spessatto began playing football in Grêmio's youth system at age 10, and he led the youth side in scoring as a right back with 17 goals during 2010. After he signed a professional contract with Grêmio, he was sent on loan to Cerâmica during 2012 and Juventude during 2013 season. In 2014, he returned to Grêmio to compete in the Campeonato Gaúcho, where he appeared in two matches.

In late August 2014, Spessatto was transferred from Grêmio to Lega Pro side Aversa Normanna for the 2014–15 season. He made his debut for the new club on 7 September, in a 2-2 away draw against Casertana for the 2nd fixture of the Lega Pro.

Honours

Club
Grêmio
Campeonato Brasileiro Sub-20: 2009
Campeonato Gaúcho: 2010

References

External links

Gabriel Spessatto profile. Portal Oficial do Grêmio.

1991 births
Living people
Brazilian footballers
Grêmio Foot-Ball Porto Alegrense players
S.F. Aversa Normanna players
Association football fullbacks